Torquay United Football Club is a professional football club based in Torquay, Devon, England. They have played their home matches at Plainmoor since 1921 and are nicknamed "The Gulls".

Founded in 1899, the club first entered the East Devon League. They went on to win the Torquay & District League in 1908–09, the Plymouth & West Devon League 1911–12, and were admitted into the Football League in 1927 after claiming the Southern League title and second-place in the Western League in 1926–27. They remained in the Third Division South for the next 31 years and were promoted out of the Fourth Division at the end of the 1959–60 season, though were relegated after two seasons in the Third Division. Torquay were again promoted in 1965–66, only to suffer another relegation six years later. They survived re-election votes after last place finishes in the Fourth Division in 1985 and 1986.

Torquay gained promotion after winning the Fourth Division play-offs in 1991, having been losing finalists in 1988. Relegated in 1992, they lost another play-off final in 1998, before securing automatic promotion in 2003–04. They lasted just one season in League One and were relegated out of the Football League after finishing bottom of League Two in 2007. Torquay lost the 2008 FA Trophy final, but won the 2009 Conference play-off final. They spent five seasons in League Two, missing out in the play-offs in 2011 and 2012, before losing their Football League status for a second time with a last place finish in 2014. Torquay were relegated from the National League in 2018, but secured immediate promotion after winning the National League South in 2018–19.

History

Formation and early years (1899–1912)
The original Torquay United was formed in 1899 by a group of school-leavers under the guidance of Sergeant-Major Edward Tomney. The newly founded club played its inaugural match against an Upton Cricket Club XI on one of local farmer, John Wright's fields, situated at the top of Penny's Hill, on Teignmouth Road.

After a season of friendlies the club joined the East Devon League and moved into the Recreation Ground, their home for the next four years. Plainmoor at the time was occupied by Torquay Athletic Rugby Club in what is a reversal of the modern day situation. In 1904 Athletic secured the lease on the Recreation Ground from United, with League rivals Ellacombe taking over the lease of Plainmoor, leaving United homeless for the first time in their existence – facilitating a return to the farmer's fields on Teignmouth Road. However the club was on the move once more when the fields were sold to be developed into what would later be known as Parkhurst Road. United soon found another home, sharing with Torquay Cricket Club in nearby Cricketfield Road (a site still used for football in the modern day by South Devon League side Upton Athletic F.C.) for four years. It was during this time that they won their first honour; the 1909 Torquay and District League title.

Following this breakthrough for the club, United merged with local rivals Ellacombe Football Club in 1910 and adopted the name Torquay Town. It was then that United finally moved into Plainmoor where they would remain to this day. During this period the ground was shared with the team's remaining local rival Babbacombe. Both sides were playing in the same league, the Plymouth and District League alongside the reserve teams of Exeter City and Plymouth Argyle, Torquay Town would later win the league in the 1911–12 season.

Election to the Football League (1920–1950) 
In 1920 after the resumption of the Football League following the First World War, United's local rivals Plymouth Argyle and Exeter City were both elected to the Football League as founder members of the Football League Third Division, this prompted a movement in the town to merge the two remaining teams and create a new entity capable of competing at this level and being elected into the new league.

Relations between the two Torquay clubs were poor, but in 1921 matters finally came to a head. Torquay Town was desperate to join its local rivals in the league and after many discussions Babbacombe at last agreed to a merger, enabling the new club to become the sole representative of the town and turn professional to further its case for league election, the new team was to be called Torquay United again, reverting to the town's name prior to 1910.

In 1921, Torquay United moved from the Plymouth and District League to the Western League; they spent one season there, before transferring to the Southern League for the 1922–23 season, once again playing alongside Plymouth and Exeter's reserve sides and also Boscombe F.C. (later to become AFC Bournemouth). Torquay went on to finish in sixth place that season and during the summer break had the audacity to apply for Football League status, but failed to gain a single vote, seeing Boscombe elected to the league instead. From 1923 onwards the league was split into Eastern and Western halves and Torquay United found themselves playing in the Western section. They remained in the Southern League until the end of the 1926–27 season, also playing in the Western League during the 1925–26 and 1926–27 seasons.

In 1925, the club battled through five qualifying rounds to reach the first round proper of the FA Cup for the first time in the club's history. Captain Percy Mackrill led the team through two 1–1 draws before a strong Reading side won the second replay 2–0 at Plainmoor.

In 1927, Torquay finally won their first league title since the Torquay and District League of 1912, winning the western division of the Southern League. United had the same number of points as Bristol City Reserves, but their 3–1 win on the final day of the season helped them to win the league on goal difference. The club then went on to lose the Southern League Championship final to the Eastern Champions Brighton & Hove Albion Reserves 4–0 but it was the start of an upturn in the club's fortunes.

Capitalising on this momentum, the club once again applied for league membership and were successful this time, joining the Football League Third Division at the expense of Aberdare Athletic, who dropped out after failing to be re-elected to the league. Finally the town of Torquay had a professional league team and had joined Plymouth and Exeter in the football league at last.

United's first match in the league took place on 27 August 1927, and was aptly against Exeter City at Plainmoor. The side for that first game was: Millsom, Cook, Smith, Wellock, Wragge, Conner, Mackey, Turner, Jones, McGovern, Thomson. A crowd of 11,625 watched a 1–1 draw with Torquay's goal coming from Bert Turner. The team's first season in the league, however, was not a success – they followed up the draw with Exeter with a 9–1 thrashing away at Millwall. Of the 48 games played that first season, Torquay won just 8, drawing 14 and losing 20. This meant that they finished their first season in the football league bottom of the table on 30 points and with a goals against tally of 103. Back then there was no automatic promotion and they were successfully re-elected to the league for the next season.

Throughout the 1930s Torquay struggled against financial problems, made all the worse by having to replace the stadium roof when it was blown off in 1930. They also failed to finish higher than 10th in twelve seasons. In the last few seasons before league football was suspended during the Second World War, Torquay struggled in Division Three South, finishing 20th, 20th and 19th out of 22 teams.

Notable Torquay players from the pre-war era include Paignton-born George Stabb, who scored 24 goals during the 1932–33 season, stalwart Albert Hutchinson (84 goals in 338 games from 1930 to 1938) and Dartmouth-born winger Ralph Birkett, who later went on to play with distinction for Arsenal and Middlesbrough and win one full England cap. Don Welsh was another player who, after playing for Torquay in the 1930s, went on to play for Charlton Athletic for 12 years, earning 3 England caps.

In 1939, Torquay qualified for the final of the Third Division South Cup, a competition in which the club had previously lost 1–0 to Exeter City in the 1934 final. However, the 1939 final (which would have been against either Queens Park Rangers or Port Vale) was never played due to the outbreak of the Second World War.

When league football was resumed in 1946, United continued to struggle and finished that season 19th. However, thanks partly to the goals of their new striker Sammy Collins, the club broke the top ten barrier in 1949 for the very first time, finishing 9th and then 5th in 1950 off the back of Collin's goalscoring finesse.

Glory days: Webber and O'Farrell (1950–1970) 

In 1954 United changed their club colours again, the black and white stripes being changed to gold and blue to reflect the resort's "sun, sand and sea image", colours which the club has maintained to this day. With the change of colours came a change in fortunes starting with the club's greatest ever FA Cup moment that very season.

After defeating Cambridge United 4–0 at home and Blyth Spartans 1–3 away, Torquay were drawn against Leeds United, away, in the third round of the Cup. Torquay were not expected to go to Elland Road and get any kind of favourable result, yet they managed to hold the Yorkshire club to a 2–2 draw; the scene was thus set for over 11,000 fans to crowd into Plainmoor on the afternoon of Wednesday, 12 January.

Incredibly, with goals from Collins, Harold Dobbie, Ronnie Shaw and captain Don Mills, playing against his old club, Torquay ran out 4–0 winners, to set up a fourth round clash with Huddersfield Town.

The Torquay United versus Huddersfield Town fourth round FA Cup game at Plainmoor will always live on in the memory of those who attended the match on 29 January 1955. Torquay lost 1–0 to the higher-placed Division One club, but the official attendance of 21,908 remains a Club record.

Following their FA Cup heroics, in the 1956–57 season Torquay just missed out on promotion to Division Two on goal average. The season had begun well – and by April, the possibility of a first promotion to Division Two was the talk of the town. After home wins against Northampton Town, Southampton, Newport County and Queens Park Rangers, United found themselves sitting at the top of the table, with future World Cup winning manager Alf Ramsey's Ipswich Town just one point behind.

A trip to Crystal Palace for the team and over 1,500 Torquay fans travelling on the last day of the season beckoned. Torquay only needed to win the game to be certain of going up, but they managed only a 1–1 draw at Selhurst Park and Ipswich, who won their final match away to Southampton, took the title on goal-average.

United failed to repeat this form the following season and after finishing 22nd in the league and were placed in the new Division Four, created by the de-regionalisation of the two third level divisions.

With Eric Webber still in charge, United ended their first season in the League's new basement division in twelfth place; but the next season, the club returned to form, and on 27 April 1960, 8,749 fans saw Torquay United beat Gillingham 2–0 at Plainmoor to return to the Third Division with two games of the season remaining. However, after only two seasons in the Third Division they were again relegated on the last day of the campaign, with a 4–2 away defeat at Barnsley, in May 1962.

Torquay came very close to regaining their Division Three status when they finished sixth in both the 1962–63 and 1963–64 campaigns. In 1963, Webber signed striker Robin Stubbs for a club record fee of £6,000 from Birmingham City; he went on to be the club's top goalscorer at the end of the 1963–64 scoring 24 goals in 34 games in his debut season.

Torquay's FA Cup run of 1964–65 was the highlight of a disappointing mid-table season as United again failed to return to the Third Division. After travelling to Canterbury City in the first round and beating them 6–0, United disposed of Colchester United in the second round 2–0 at Plainmoor. In the third round, Torquay were drawn at home to English football giants; Tottenham Hotspur.

In front of Plainmoor's second ever largest attendance – the official attendance was slightly above 20,000 – the team performed well: Billy Atkinson put United 1–0 up from the penalty spot after Robin Stubbs had been felled; Spurs responded turning on the style to give themselves a 3–1 lead with two goals from Alan Gilzean and one from Maurice Norman; and then, in the last few minutes, it was the turn of record signing Robin Stubbs to net two goals and make it 3–3.

The first attempt at a replay in London was cancelled, with the majority of United's travelling fans having already arrived in the capital. A week later though, in front of 55,000-strong crowd at White Hart Lane, the match went ahead. Jimmy Greaves scored a hat trick as Tottenham showed their class to win 5–1, Stubbs hitting Torquay's lone consolation goal.

After finishing in 12th at the end of the season, Eric Webber was finally sacked after 15 years as manager by United's new chairman Tony Boyce, who felt the club needed refreshing; both Boyce and Webber's successor were soon to write their own part of United's history.

Webber's replacement was Frank O'Farrell who arrived fresh from winning the Southern League title with Weymouth. In his first season in charge, O'Farrell oversaw Torquay's second promotion when they finished third in Division Four, while England won the World Cup on home soil.

During the following couple of seasons O'Farrell used his connections at West Ham United to bring many ex-Hammers to Plainmoor, John Bond and ex-international Ken Brown being two famous Upton Park names to appear in gold and blue. At the end of their 1966–67 campaign United finished in seventh, and at the end of their 1967–68 season, United came very close to promotion to Division Two, once again.

With Torquay leading the table during Easter 1968, United got their first ever coverage on Match of the Day, beating promotion rivals Bury 3–0 in front of more than 10,000 fans at Plainmoor; however a poor run-in saw United finish fourth, two points behind the promoted duo, Oxford United and Bury, with Shrewsbury Town in third place. This period also coincided with the club's fans being voted the 'Best Behaved Supporters in the League'.

The O'Farrell era ended in 1968–69, when he left to manage First Division Leicester City and later Manchester United.

Lower league disappointment (1970–1988) 
During the following end-of-season clear-out, star striker Robin Stubbs was sold to Bristol Rovers for £12,000. Another two seasons of indifference in Division Three saw the club finish in mid-table positions, then at the end of the 1971–72 campaign, United found themselves in the relegation zone, and back in the basement division.

This led to a relatively uneventful decade with the club consistently scratching out mid-table finishes. Although in January 1977 Pat Kruse, a centre-half for Torquay, did create a world record by scoring an own goal after just six seconds in a league match against Cambridge United at Plainmoor.

O'Farrell made a return to Plainmoor in 1976 when Malcolm Musgrove lost his job after a disappointing FA Cup defeat against non-league outfit Hillingdon Borough. He soon moved upstairs into the position of consultant manager, and ex-Plymouth Argyle promotion-winning captain Mike Green was brought in to control first team matters. The end of the 1977–78 season saw the Gulls finish in ninth place, with Willie Brown finishing up as top goalscorer with 12 goals.

Halfway through the campaign, just before Green's arrival, O'Farrell bought local Devon-born striker Colin Lee from Bristol City, who duly scored on his Torquay debut, and went on to score 10 goals in 23 games. His time at Plainmoor was short, for in October of the following season United accepted a £60,000 offer from Tottenham Hotspur for his services. Lee would famously go on to score four goals on his debut for the London club during their 9–0 demolition of Bristol Rovers and would return to United in various capacities in later years ranging from caretaker manager, to director of football and later, chief executive.

Green then left the club, to be replaced at the helm, for the third time, by Frank O'Farrell. O'Farrell didn't stay in charge of team matters for long, bringing in ex-Scotland international Bruce Rioch to become player-coach. After a great start to the 1981–82 season, the Gulls soon started to flag, and ended up finishing in fifteenth place.

During the following summer Rioch was named manager, and the following 1982–83 campaign saw United again off to a flying start. They finished 12th, but reached the fourth round of the FA Cup for the third time, going out of the competition at Plainmoor after a thrilling 2–3 defeat at the hands of Sheffield Wednesday.

Money was tight at the club and the club's board was putting pressure on Rioch to sell Colin Anderson the club's star player at the time to balance the books, following Rioch claiming "a good few for Anderson could well save the club". Anderson's form nosedived, infuriating Rioch – this culminated in Rioch punching the player in the jaw after Anderson nutmegged him during a five-a-side match in training. Faced with the prospect of Anderson going to the PFA over the matter, the club suggested Rioch resign, which he promptly did. Twenty years later, he said, "What I did was inexcusable. It was a period of my career which I deeply regret, but I learned from the experience".

During this period, United – as all English clubs were at the time – were struggling with falling attendances and a negative perception of football in the country as a whole, and by the end of the season on 2 May 1984 only 967 spectators watched the 1–0 victory over Chester City at Plainmoor.

During this time Lew Pope had taken over as chairman from Tony Boyce, and in February 1984 former Chelsea favourite Dave Webb took charge of the club. Webb brought in ex-Bournemouth players Derek Dawkins and goalkeeper Kenny Allen to strengthen the squad, and also attracted the former internationals Eddie Kelly and Tony Currie to the club, United would go on to finish the season in a strong 9th place.

However, in Webb's first full season at the healm, the 1984–85 season United finished bottom of Division Four and had to apply for re-election to stay in the Football League for the first time since their inaugural season in the Football League. To worsen the problems the club was enduring, a 'suspicious' fire destroyed half of the grandstand on 17 May 1985 just six days after the Bradford City stadium fire, destroying a third of the old grandstand. Nobody was hurt, but as a result, the ground's capacity fell to below 5,000.

For the 1985–86 season David Webb became managing director and appointed Stuart Morgan as manager. However, for the second successive year United finished bottom of Division Four, and again had to apply for re-election. The last side to finish bottom of the league two seasons in a row, Workington lost their league place, but Torquay's bid was successful.

The 1986–87 season saw automatic relegation to the Football Conference introduced into Division Four for the first time. With the final game of the season to go, Torquay were third from bottom on 47 points; below them were Burnley on 46 points and Tranmere Rovers, also on 47 points but with an inferior goal difference. Lincoln City had 48 points and seemed in least danger.

The final game of the season was against Crewe Alexandra, featuring a young David Platt, at Plainmoor. At half-time Crewe were leading 2–0 and things looked bad for Torquay, two minutes into the second-half Torquay's centre-half, Jim McNichol, scored from a free kick but despite an all-out attack, Torquay seem unable to get the equaliser even hitting the crossbar. Tranmere secured safety by winning their final game on the Friday night. Burnley were winning their game, and while Lincoln were being beaten by Swansea, they would still finish above Torquay by a single point as things stood.

Seven minutes from time a piece of football folklore was created. A police dog by the name of Bryn appeared to think that Jim McNichol was running to attack his handler, and sank his teeth into the centre-half's thigh. It was during the resultant four minutes of injury time that Paul Dobson scored possibly the most important goal in the club's history, and kept them in the Football League, with Lincoln dropping into the Football Conference. This was dubbed by many as "The Great Escape" – something United fans have had to become very familiar with in subsequent years.

A new era and the Bateson years (1988–2008) 
The start of the 1987–88 season marked the dawn of a new era in Torquay United's history. Cyril Knowles became manager marking a turn for the better in the club's fortunes. The season started with a 6–1 victory over Wrexham at Plainmoor, and ended with Torquay just missing out on automatic promotion, but earning a play-off place, losing in the play-off final to Swansea City after losing 1–2 in Wales, and battling to a 3–3 draw at a rain-soaked Plainmoor, the Swans being promoted on a 5–4 aggregate. Also during this season, Torquay United beat Tottenham Hotspur 1–0 at Plainmoor reviving memories of the great cup tie of 1965, Derek Dawkins scoring the important goal in the first leg of a League Cup game. The team also reached the southern semi-final of the Football League Trophy. During the season Knowles also introduced a 16-year-old left winger called Lee Sharpe to the team.

In May 1988 Lee Sharpe transferred to Manchester United for £180,000 in one of the biggest transfers of Torquay United's history at that time, he would later go on to represent England on the international stage as well.

Nearly a year later in May 1989, United made their first appearance at Wembley in the final of the Sherpa Van Trophy (the successor to the Freight Rover Trophy). Torquay had disposed of Swansea City and Cardiff City in the group stages before beating Gillingham, Bristol Rovers, Hereford United and finally Wolverhampton Wanderers in the Southern final to reach the final. A crowd of 46,513 saw Dean Edwards put Torquay 1–0 up against Bolton Wanderers but Bolton won 4–1.

Mike Bateson took over as Torquay chairman in May 1990, taking over from Lew Pope. The beginning of the 1990–91 season saw Torquay off to a wonderful start – they were unbeaten for 14 games and were clear leaders in November but they faded dramatically, Bateson sacked Smith in April and appointed former United captain and then youth coach John Impey as manager. Impey proceeded to breathe new life into the team, guiding them to 7th place and the play-offs for a second time.

Torquay won promotion again on 31 May 1991, winning a play-off final on the club's second visit to Wembley against higher-placed Blackpool. Goals from Wes Saunders and Dean Edwards earned Torquay a 2–2 draw in normal time. No further goals in extra time resulted in a penalty shoot-out. Successful penalties by Micky Holmes, Wes Saunders, Paul Holmes, Chris Myers and goalkeeper Gareth Howells, combined with Dave Bamber's miss for the opposition, made Torquay winners 5–4 on penalties. The Gulls were promoted to Division Three due to this victory.

However, despite the high-profile signing of Justin Fashanu, football's first openly gay footballer, the appointment of Ivan Golac as manager and well publicised visits of Julie Goodyear to the dressing room, United were relegated again after just one season. Golac's time at United was brief and Paul Compton was appointed to replace him in 1992. The introduction of the FA Premier League at the end of the season meant they were relegated from Division Three to Division Three.

Paul Compton invited Neil Warnock to help him as consultant in January 1993, but shortly after this he resigned leaving Warnock in charge. The former Scarborough and Notts County manager guided the club through another close shave with relegation and then left.

His major addition to United's playing staff, player-coach Don O'Riordan, took the senior job. O'Riordan continued to play an important midfield role and he managed, on a tight budget, to guide United to the play-offs again during the 1993–94 season, finishing sixth and once again qualifying for the play-offs. However, the team missed out on a third trip to Wembley after an ill-tempered play-off semi-final against Preston North End, 2–0 up after the First Leg, Torquay United lost 4–1 at Deepdale in the final match played on their artificial pitch.

At the end of the 1995–96 season Torquay finished bottom of Division Three after a disastrous campaign and were threatened with relegation to the Football Conference. However, they were saved from relegation when Stevenage Borough's ground was deemed unfit for League football. Eddie May, who had replaced O'Riordan early in the campaign, was dismissed at the end of the season and replaced by Kevin Hodges.

In the 1997–98 season after finishing fifth at the end of the league season, Torquay United were once again in the promotion play-offs. Had the team won a point in their final game of the season at Leyton Orient, they would have gone up automatically, but they lost the game 2–1. An emphatic 7–2 (on aggregate) victory over Scarborough in the semi-final, including 4 goals from star striker Rodney Jack, resulted in Torquay United's third appearance at Wembley. However, United lost 1–0 to Colchester United in the Wembley final (played on a Friday night due an England game the following day meaning that thousands of fans were unable to get to the game). Kevin Hodges left the club to return to his former club Plymouth Argyle after the season ended, and Wes Saunders (who had previously been caretaker manager for much of the 1991–92 season) returned as manager.

The following season proved to be a massive disappointment, and Torquay only narrowly avoided relegation to the Football Conference. Matters improved in the 1999–00 season, with a finish of 9th, just three points off the play-offs. However, 2000–01 proved to be a dreadful season, and Saunders was sacked with the club adrift at the bottom of the table. He was replaced by Colin Lee, who improved results and gave the club a chance of survival. On 5 May 2001, the final game of the 2000–01 season saw United away to Barnet. Before the start of the game Barnet were bottom of the Third Division, one point behind Torquay. The Gulls needed to avoid defeat to keep their League status, Barnet needed to win. Thousands of fans were locked outside the tiny Underhill ground as United stormed to a 3–0 lead, with goals from Kevin Hill, Jason Rees, and David Graham. Barnet fought back to 3–2, but United held on for the win to condemn Barnet to the Football Conference.

Lee left at the end of the season and was replaced by Roy McFarland, who only managed to deliver a mediocre 19th-place finish the following season; McFarland subsequently quit at the end of the season, in protest of Mike Bateson's decision to sack assistant manager David Preece without consulting McFarland, who was replaced by Leroy Rosenior. 2002–03 would see a major improvement over the previous two campaigns and a finish of 9th place, with only a late run of bad results keeping Torquay out of the play-offs. The end of the 2003–04 season saw United win automatic promotion for the third time in their history, against all odds in a nail-biting finale at Southend. However their stay in the third tier of the football pyramid was only to last for one season, as a final day defeat against Colchester United condemned the Gulls to a return to the 4th division of the leagues after narrowly being edged out by Milton Keynes Dons for safety in Football League One. The fact that it was the MK Dons that had stayed up at Torquay's expense saw messages of sympathy from fans of other clubs, mainly out of a dislike for the franchising of football.

In the 2005–06 FA Cup 3rd round Torquay managed to pull off a 0–0 draw with Premiership strugglers Birmingham City. However they lost the replay at St Andrew's 2–0. Despite this achievement (and the windfall generated by the replay) the club fell into the relegation places of League Two. Former Exeter City manager John Cornforth took over as caretaker manager from Leroy Rosenior and soon after was appointed as manager until the end of the season. The side's form worsened however, and Ian Atkins replaced Cornforth in April. Torquay United's form immediately turned around going on a four-match unbeaten run, Atkins managed to rescue the side and lift them a comfortable three points from relegation.

Torquay made a decent start to the following season and were in the play-off spots for the first few months of the season, but a run of just 1 point from 9 games saw them crash into another relegation battle. In October 2006, Bateson stepped down as chairman to be replaced by Chris Roberts, who soon afterwards sacked Atkins, replacing him with former Czech international Luboš Kubík.
Despite his credentials as a player, there was some concern raised that Kubik had no real history as a coach, and he did little to endear himself to fans by bringing in Richard Hancox as coach. Torquay's dire form continued, and the club crashed to the bottom of the table on Boxing Day; they would ultimately never leave the foot of the table after that. After the worst run of form in the club's history, Kubik eventually quit on 5 February, having won just one of his matches in charge, and Colin Lee was soon after appointed as the new director of football and Keith Curle was appointed as Head Coach on 7 February 2007. Roberts resigned amid growing pressure from supporters and the board of directors, all of whom were unhappy with his conduct as chairman, on 21 February 2007. Local hotel owner Keith Richardson was announced as the new chairman the following day. However, on 7 March 2007, former chairman Mike Bateson was reappointed as chairman, the move coming about due to Chris Roberts' company, Torquay United Holdings, being unable to meet the next payment to purchase the club from Bateson.
Curle was unable to significantly improve matters, and Torquay United lost their 80-year Football League status on 14 April 2007, following a 1–1 draw at home to Peterborough United. Illustrating just how disastrously wrong the season had gone, 4 of the club's 7 wins and 18 of their 35 points had been earned while Atkins was in charge, and before Roberts took over the club. The side's post-season soon descended into chaos, as Mike Bateson stepped down as chairman and was replaced by Mervyn Benney, after which Colin Lee was sacked, and Keith Curle was not invited back to coach Torquay United and soon took a coaching job at Crystal Palace instead. Former manager Leroy Rosenior was reappointed, only to be sacked on the same day.

Finally, a new consortium headed by Alex Rowe and Cris Boyce, fiscally backed by £15M National Lottery winner and United fan Paul Bristow, bought the club from Bateson. Rowe was installed as the new chairman, and former player Paul Buckle appointed the club's new manager, who set about rebuilding the team for its first season in the Conference Premier.

First spell in the football conference (2008–2009) 

Torquay United started their first season in the Conference Premier well, beating Aldershot Town 3–0 and remained unbeaten until a 3–1 loss away to Burton Albion in September. This defeat appeared to spur them on and they won 5 straight games, leading the table by the end of October. Their form in the league dipped through November and December but a 4–1 victory over rivals Yeovil Town in the FA Cup, live on the BBC, gave the club a massive boost. They couldn't take advantage of this and dropped numerous points over the Christmas period including a 4–3 defeat to arch rivals Exeter City. Torquay got their revenge, beating Exeter City 1–0 a week later. However, by the end of January, Torquay were second, three points behind Aldershot Town. An unbeaten February followed but Torquay were now 5 points off Aldershot Town. Away from the league, Torquay were progressing well in the FA Trophy and had reached the semi-finals by the end of the month. March started horribly with Torquay losing their first three league games of the month including a 2–1 defeat at home to leaders Aldershot Town, this caused Torquay to fall 14 points off the top and drop to fourth. On Saturday, 15 March 2008, Torquay reached Wembley for the first time in ten years with a 2–1 aggregate win over York City in the semi finals of the FA Trophy.

After finishing 3rd in the Conference Premier, Torquay had to play their fiercest rivals Exeter City to determine who would reach the play-off final to play either Cambridge United or Burton Albion. Torquay had to play Exeter City away first with the return leg at Plainmoor. Torquay started the first leg poorly and were fortunate when Tim Sills scored just before half-time but Exeter City levelled when Wayne Carlisle equalised. Just when the game looked like a draw Chris Zebroski pounced on a poor clearance by Paul Jones to make the final score 2–1 to United. Torquay knew going into the second leg that if they scored one goal Exeter City would need two goals to force extra time, and when Kevin Hill scored in the second half in his record-equalling appearance, the match seemed all over. However, Exeter City scored four goals in the space of 18 minutes, dumping Torquay out of the play-offs and ensuring they would have to spend another season in non-league football.

On 10 May 2008, Torquay lost 1–0 in the FA Trophy final to Ebbsfleet United at Wembley, with former Gulls striker Chris McPhee scoring the winner just before half-time.

Torquay started their second season in the Conference Premier as badly as the first one had finished, picking up only 5 points from their opening 7 games. However, the following three months were to be the best in years, as Torquay remained unbeaten from 7 September 2008 to 2 December 2008, setting a 17-game unbeaten record. They reached the FA Cup 3rd round with a 2–0 win over Oxford United at the end of November. The start of 2009 was shaky but on 3 January 2009 Torquay beat Blackpool 1–0 at home in the FA Cup 3rd round to reach the 4th round of the competition for the first time in 19 years where they faced Coventry City. They struggled for goals throughout January and, against Coventry City with a sell out crowd of 6,018, they lost a game which they should have won, losing dramatically to an 87th-minute goal by Elliot Ward. At the end of the month they lost to Southport 3–0 in the FA Trophy 3rd round.

Torquay United were promoted back to the Football League on 17 May 2009 after a 2–0 victory over Cambridge United in the Conference Premier play-off final at Wembley.

With goals from club captain Chris Hargreaves and leading scorer Tim Sills Torquay triumphed 2–0 over Cambridge in an entertaining match watched by over 35,000 fans. Lee Phillips played for Cambridge that day, and set a record (for a non-league player) of losing at Wembley three times in three years with three clubs.

Promotion back to the Football League (2009–2014) 
In their first season back in League Two, Torquay finished the season in 17th place with 57 points; following victories over Cheltenham Town and Stockport County, the club progressed to the third round of the 2009–10 FA Cup, where they lost 1–0 to Brighton & Hove Albion.

The next season, Torquay United reached the fourth round, equalling the club record. On 29 January 2011, they had the possibility of progressing to the fifth round of the FA Cup, but lost 0–1 to Conference Premier leaders Crawley Town. There was added misery for Torquay United fans the next day when the draw for the FA Cup fifth round saw Crawley Town being scheduled to play away to Manchester United. Had Torquay been drawn against Manchester United, they would have benefited from the money that such a tie generates.

That same season, Torquay came 7th, guaranteeing a play-off place on the final day of the season on goal difference, despite losing 1–3 to Rotherham United. They met Shrewsbury Town in the play-off semi-final, progressing to the final thanks to a 2–0 aggregate win, with both goals coming in the home leg. On Saturday, 28 May 2011, they lost 1–0 in the final to Stevenage and remained in League Two for the 2011–12 season. Paul Buckle resigned the day after the defeat, and moved to Bristol Rovers, taking assistant manager Shaun North and several Torquay players with him to the Memorial Stadium.

United enjoyed an even more successful season in 2011–12 under new manager Martin Ling, achieving a record high of second place in League Two. However towards the end of the season their form dipped and, after finishing in sixth place, they had to settle for a play-off tie against Cheltenham Town. They lost the away leg 2–0 then lost the home leg 2–1 (agg. 4–1), ensuring another season in the fourth tier.

Despite Ling announcing that the team were looking for another promotion season, they were stuck in mid-table during the first half of the 2012–13 campaign, before Ling was taken ill in mid-January. A disastrous run of losses under assistant manager Shaun Taylor followed, with the club dropping to just above the relegation zone. That led to Alan Knill being appointed as interim manager for the remainder of the season. Results picked up after that, and a run of three games unbeaten at the end of the season ultimately secured their Football League status with a 19th-place finish. Ling was dismissed at the end of the season, the board noting that results had been unacceptable even before his illness, and Knill's role was made permanent.

The 2013–14 season was, once again, a torrid one and relegation beckoned. On 27 April 2014, after only winning 12 games throughout the season, and with a top goal scorer only able to reach 5 goals, Torquay were once again relegated to the Conference Premier. That was despite beating Mansfield Town 3–1 on the penultimate weekend, after both Bristol Rovers and Northampton Town won their games.

Great escapes and further relegation (2014–2019) 
Torquay started the 2014–15 season poorly, losing their first game 3–1 to Gateshead. However, the Gulls subsequently went on a ten match unbeaten run. After the unbeaten run, Torquay's form was indifferent, leading to a 13th-place position in their first season back in non-league.

Early in 2015, chairwoman Thea Bristow announced that the club was up for sale. After Bristow resigned in March 2015, she agreed to transfer her estimated 80%, one million pound, stake in the club for £1, subject to sale of to new locally based owners. In June 2015, ownership of the club was taken up by a new consortium made up of 10 local business people. The new board, operating on a substantially smaller budget, took decisive action, firstly putting Chris Hargreaves (manager), Lee Hodges (assistant manager) and Kenny Veysey (goalkeeping coach) on gardening leave, disbanding the youth department, and appointing Paul Cox as manager.

The appointment of Cox, however, was short-lived, with him leaving Torquay just three months later. He later claimed that the club had been unable to pay him. Shortly after this, on 19 September 2015, United suffered their biggest loss in 20 years, when they lost 7–3 at home to Bromley. On 28 September 2015, it was announced by the club that Kevin Nicholson, former Torquay United player and club legend, would be the new player-manager. Following a dramatic upturn in results, during which the team overturned a 12-point deficit, Torquay confirmed their place in the National League for 2016–17 with a 2–0 victory over Bromley on 16 April.

The 2016–17 season started amid much uncertainty, with the club struggling financially whilst looking for new ownership and economic security. Uncertainty off the field and financial constraints once again meant that the club languished near the bottom of the National League, and in March they found themselves slipping into the relegation zone. Off the field, a consortium, led by Dave Phillips, was looking to complete a deal with Swindon-based gaming and leisure company, Gaming international. A deal was finally agreed in December 2016, and ratified by the National League in March 2017. Mimicking the previous season, a strong run of form towards the end of the campaign meant that Torquay narrowly avoided relegation on the final day of the season. Nine points in the last three games, culminating in a 2–0 win at home to already relegated North Ferriby United, meant that another season in the National League was guaranteed.

Torquay began the 2017–18 season poorly and consequently, after two seasons in charge of the club, player-manager Nicholson departed on 17 August 2017. After a month under the interim management of assistant manager Robbie Herrera it was announced that new head coach Gary Owers and assistant head coach Martin Kuhl would take over management of the club. Despite the change in management at United there was little change in fortunes, with the club spending most of the season in the league's bottom four. A slight improvement in form throughout March gave United some hope of a third "great escape" in a row. However, on 21 April 2018, relegation to the National League South was confirmed following a 1–1 away draw at Hartlepool United, meaning United would play in the sixth tier of the English Football League system in 2018–19.

United kept faith with Owers over the summer and started the new campaign in the National League South under his management. However Torquay's lacklustre start to the campaign, with only 12 points and 5 goals in 9 games meant that Owers stepped down from his role one day shy of a year in charge. A day later on 13 September 2018, Gary Johnson was appointed manager.

The Gary Johnson era and promotion (2019–present) 
The club saw a revival in fortunes under Johnson, remaining unbeaten for four months and eventually rising to top the table by mid-January. They lost their first game since Johnson's appointment 3–2 to Bath City on 19 January 2019. However a run of 10 wins from 13 matches after the Bath loss, in which United picked up 32 point from 39 available saw them crowned champions of the National League South on 13 April 2019. A 2–0 win over Eastbourne Borough, with promotion rivals Woking losing 2–0 at Chelmsford was enough to see United clinch their first promotion since 2009, and their first league championship title since 1927. In 2019–20, Torquay finished 14th in their first season back in the fifth tier after the season was cancelled in March 2020 due to disruption caused by the COVID-19 pandemic.

In 2020–21, the Gulls were top of the National League between October and March before a poor run of form saw Torquay miss out on automatic promotion by finishing 2nd. In the play-off semi-final, Torquay managed to beat Notts County 4–2 after extra time to set up a play-off final against Hartlepool United at Ashton Gate, Bristol. Hartlepool took the lead in the first half before Torquay's goalkeeper Lucas Covolan equalised in the 95th minute. The game finished 1–1 after extra time, however, Torquay lost out 5–4 on penalties. The game picked up a lot of attention on social media platforms by many football fans & pundits due to some dubious refereeing decisions.

Crest and colours

Crest

Torquay's initial crest was based heavily on the town's coat of arms, featuring a three-masted ship, to represent the region's longstanding association with shipping, it also displayed a castled gateway and the golden wings were to represent wings of the local seagulls. The crest remained in use until the mid eighties, with one change in the 1970s to incorporate the 'gulls wings' emblem which is familiar today. That meant, however, that the three-masted ship was removed from the design. During an unsuccessful spell on the pitch during the 1980s, during which time the club finished bottom of the Football League system twice, the emblem was switched to a circular design incorporating two palm trees. In 1986, the club chose to go back to the gull emblem, encircled by the club name.

In the years that followed multiple versions of this crest were produced, so in 2017 the badge was refreshed to 'unify' these multiple versions and produce a cleaner, more modern design.

Colours
Torquay United went through various team colours before settling on the familiar yellow and blue of today. In the club's formative days they played in a light and dark blue kit, before switching to a black and white striped kit reminiscent of a modern-day Newcastle United kit. This identity change led to the club being dubbed 'the magpies'. The magpies played in this colour scheme until the club opted for a fresh identity In 1954. United based their new image around the town's traditional seaside character and they chose a more distinctive yellow, or gold and blue kit. The new colours were chosen to represent the area's golden sands and blue sky and sea.
For the majority of the years since this change the club has worn these colours in varying styles, currently favouring a predominantly yellow shirt with blue trim.
The switch from black and white also heralded the birth of a new nickname 'The Gulls'.

Stadium

Early years and Plainmoor
United played their very first game, a friendly, against an Upton Cricket Club XI on one of farmer John Wright's fields, which was situated at the top of Penny's Hill, on Teignmouth Road.

After a season of friendlies the club joined the East Devon League and moved to the Recreation Ground, which was to be their home for the following four years. In 1904 Torquay Athletic Rugby Football Club secured the lease of the Recreation Ground (it remains their home today) and United moved back to the Teignmouth Road site, but again was forced to move when the field was sold to developers to build Parkhurst Road. At the time Torquay Cricket Club were located nearby in Cricketfield Road, and so this site was United's next home.

The club remained in Cricketfield Road for four years. In 1910 United merged with Ellacombe to become Torquay Town. Ellacombe's Plainmoor ground became the home of the new club, and the shared home of local rivals Babbacombe.

Torquay Town and Babbacome finally merged and became Torquay United (again) in 1921. The club has remained at Plainmoor ever since.

On 17 May 1985, a fire swept through the then fifty-year-old main stand 'The Grandstand', just six days after a fire at Valley Parade Stadium in Bradford, in which over fifty people lost their lives. This incident occurred in the early hours of the morning, and nobody was injured. After initially suspecting that this could have been a copycat arson of the Bradford City stadium fire, eventual cause was attributed to an electrical fault.

Throughout the late eighties and early nineties the infrastructure at the ground was given a major overhaul, with the mini stand at the home end of the ground being redeveloped. In its place is now the family stand – a covered, all seater stand with board rooms, a club shop, restaurant and club bar. After this was completed attention turned to redevelopment of the 'popular side', which was fully covered and updated to modern-day standards. In 2000–01 the away end was also redeveloped with a new covered standing area.

The old wooden grandstand, initially costing £150 and erected at Plainmoor for United's inaugural season in the Football League stood until 2011. Prior to its time at Plainmoor the stand had previously stood at Buckfastleigh Racecourse. It was demolished to create a new stand built in 2012 named Bristow's Bench in memory of the late Paul Bristow.

Possible move
Following his takeover of the club in October 2006, chairman Chris Roberts went on record stating his desire to move the club to a new multipurpose stadium catering for football, rugby and athletics. Speculation placed the site of the new complex at the Torquay Recreation Ground, currently occupied by Torquay Athletic Rugby Club. Since Roberts' resignation this move has become unlikely, with succeeding chairman Alex Rowe distancing himself from the plans saying that the club and the fans wish to remain at Plainmoor and will build upon the current ground to increase capacity. The club are looking to buy the houses behind the away end and building an extension to the away end and also to acquire the nearby school (Westlands) and build a bigger grandstand to increase the capacity to around 9,000.

Plans for an extended grandstand were submitted to the council for planning permission, in co-operation with Westlands school in 2010.
This was approved on 9 June 2011 with the increased cost believed to be approximately £2 million with the new structure to be named "Bristow's Bench" in memory of the late Paul Bristow, who essentially underwrote the Gulls' return to the football league. With the demolition of the old Grandstand and the new stand not being ready for the 2011–12 season Plainmoor capacity stood at 4,500 for the 2011–12 season. It was however ready in time for the start of the 2012–13 season where it witnessed its first sell out crowd with the visit of Devon neighbours Plymouth Argyle in early September.

Rumours of a potential move away from Plainmoor have resurfaced since the takeover of the club by Gaming International. The club's new owners have made it known that they would be keen to relocate the stadium facilities and incorporate football into a new multi-use complex in Torbay, developing the existing Plainmoor site for housing.
However plans have proved controversial with United fans, and further certainty has been called for. This has led to a decision to postpone talks between Torbay Council and GI over the purchase of the freehold.

Players

Current squad

Out on loan

Notable former players

Staff

Current coaching staff

Managerial history

Honours

League
 Third Division South (Tier 3)
 Runners-up: 1956–57
 Fourth Division / League Two (Tier 4)
 Promoted (3rd): 1959–60, 1965–66, 2003–04
 Play-off winners: 1990–91
 Play-off runners up: 2010–11
 Southern League (Western Section) (Tier 4)
 Winners (1): 1926–27
 Conference (Tier 5)
 Play-off winners: 2008–09
 Play-off runners-up: 2020–21
 National League South (Tier 6)
 Winners (1): 2018–19
 Plymouth and District League
 Winners: 1911–12
 Torquay and District League
 Winners: 1908–09

Cups
 Third Division South Cup
 Runners-up: 1933–34
 Finalists: 1938–39 (final never played due to outbreak of World War II)
 Football League Trophy
 Runners-up: 1988–89
 FA Trophy
 Runners-up: 2007–08
 Devon Senior Cup
 Winners: 1910–11, 1921–22

Records and statistics
Best FA Cup performance: Fourth round, 1948–49, 1954–55, 1970–71, 1982–83, 1989–90, 2008–09, 2010–11
Best FA Trophy performance: Finalists, 2007–08
Record attendance: 21,908 vs Huddersfield Town, FA Cup fourth round, 29 January 1955
Biggest victory: 9–0 vs Swindon Town, Football League Third Division South, 8 March 1952
Heaviest defeat: 2–10 vs Fulham, Football League Division Three South, 7 September 1931
Most appearances: Dennis Lewis, 442 (1947–1959)
Most goals: Sammy Collins, 219 (1948–1958)

Notable purchases
 Leon Constantine from Peterborough United for £75,000 in December 2004 (current club record)
 Billy Bodin from Swindon Town for £70,000 in July 2012
 Eifion Williams from Barry Town for £70,000 in March 1999 (previous club record)
 Robin Stubbs from Birmingham City for £6,000 in 1963 (previous club record)

Notable sales
 Rodney Jack to Crewe Alexandra for £650,000 in July 1998 (current club record)
 Matthew Gregg to Crystal Palace for £400,000 in October 1998
 David Graham to Wigan Athletic for £315,000 in August 2004
 Bobby Olejnik to Peterborough United for £300,000 in June 2012
 Lee Sharpe to Manchester United for £185,000 in May 1988 (previous club record)
 Eunan O'Kane to AFC Bournemouth for £175,000 in July 2012
 Angus MacDonald to Barnsley for £100,000 in August 2016
 Mark Ellis to Crewe Alexandra for £80,000 in June 2012
 Colin Lee to Tottenham Hotspur for £60,000 in the 1978–79 season (previous club record)
 Dan Lavercombe to Wigan Athletic for £30,000 in January 2016

Notes

References

External links 

 Torquay United Official Club Website
 Torquay United Fans Unofficial Forum

 
Football clubs in Devon
Former English Football League clubs
Association football clubs established in 1899
Southern Football League clubs
Sport in Torquay
1899 establishments in England
Football clubs in England
National League (English football) clubs